Hněvošice is a municipality and village in Opava District in the Moravian-Silesian Region of the Czech Republic. It has about 1,000 inhabitants. It is part of the historic Hlučín Region.

Etymology
The name is probably derived from the personal name Hněvoš. The German name originated in 1630. After 1736, the folk name Něboščice also appeared.

Geography
It lies in the Opava Hilly Land within the Silesian Lowlands.

History
The first written mention of Hněvošice is from 1288, when the brothers Trutvín and Vítek were the owners of Hněvošice. They built a courtyard and a fortress. The courtyard was destroyed by fire at the beginning of the 18th century.

From 1742 the village belonged to Prussia after Maria Theresa had been defeated. In 1920, the municipality was annexed to Czechoslovakia and incorporated into the district of Hlučín. In 1928, it was changed to the Opava District.

Sights

The most valuable building is the Church of Saints Peter and Paul. It is the only still standing wooden church in the Hlučín Region and has been protected as a cultural monument. It has preserved original interior. The church was built in the Baroque style in 1730 and restored in 1842. It was funded by Johann Rudolf Žarovský from Žarov.

References

External links

Villages in Opava District
Hlučín Region